A school shooting is an armed attack at an educational institution, such as a primary school, secondary school, high school or university, involving the use of a firearm. Many school shootings are also categorized as mass shootings due to multiple casualties. The phenomenon is most widespread in the United States, which has the highest number of school-related shootings, although school shootings have taken place elsewhere in the world.

According to studies, factors behind school shooting include easy access to firearms, family dysfunction, lack of family supervision, and mental illness among many other psychological issues. Among the topmost motives of attackers were: bullying/persecution/threatened (75%) and revenge (61%), while 54% reported having numerous reasons. The remaining motives included an attempt to solve a problem (34%), suicide or depression (27%), and seeking attention or recognition (24%).

Especially in the United States, school shootings have sparked a political debate over gun violence, zero tolerance policies, gun rights and gun control.

Profiling
The United States Secret Service published the results from a study regarding 37 school shooting incidents, involving 41 individuals in the United States from December 1974 through May 2000. In a previous report of 18 school shootings by the Federal Bureau of Investigation (FBI), they released a profile that described shooters as middle-class, lonely/alienated, awkward, Caucasian males who had access to guns. The most recent report cautioned against the assumption that a perpetrator can be identified by a certain 'type' or profile. The results from the study indicated that perpetrators came from differing backgrounds, making a singular profile difficult when identifying a possible assailant. For example, some perpetrators were children of divorce, lived in foster homes, or came from intact nuclear families. The majority of individuals had rarely or never gotten into trouble at school and had a healthy social life. Some, such as Alan Lipman, have warned against the dearth of empirical validity of profiling methods.

Sex and gender
Almost all perpetrators of school shootings were born male and identified as male at the time of the shooting.

Age
According to Raine (2002), immaturity is one of many identified factors increasing the likelihood of an individual committing criminal acts of violence and outbursts of aggression. This fact is supported by findings on brain development occurring as individuals age from birth.

According to the Australian-based Raising children network and Centre for Adolescent Health (and other sources): the main change occurring in the developing brain during adolescence is the (so-called) pruning of unused connections in thinking and processing. While this is occurring within the brain, retained connections are strengthened. Synaptic pruning occurs because the nervous system in humans develops by firstly, the over-producing of parts of the nervous system, axons, neurons, and synapses, to then later in the development of the nervous system, make the superfluous parts redundant, i.e. pruning (or apoptosis, otherwise known as cell death). These changes occur in certain parts of the brain firstly; the pre-frontal cortex, the brain location where decision-making occurs, is the concluding area for development.

While the pre-frontal cortex is developing, children and teenagers might possibly rely more on the brain part known as the amygdala; involving thinking that is more emotionally active, including aggression and impulsiveness. As a consequence each individual is more likely to want to make riskier choices, and to do so more frequently.

Steinberg (2004) identified the fact of adolescents taking more risks, typically, than adults; 
Deakin et al. (2004), and Overman et al. (2004) indicate a decline in risk taking from adolescence to adulthood; 
Steinberg (2005), Figner et al. (2009), and Burnett et al. (2010) identified adolescent age individuals as more likely to take risks than young children and adults.

Family dynamics
One assumption into the catalytic causes of school shootings comes from the "non-traditional" household perspective, which focuses on how family structure and family stability are related to child outcomes. Broadly speaking, proponents of this hypothesis claim that family structures such as single mothers, same-sex parents, extended family, or cohabitation are more harmful to the development of a child's mental well-being, than heterosexual, married parents (often equated with the idea of a nuclear family). This perspective is found to back federal efforts such as the Personal Responsibility and Work Opportunity Reconciliation Act (PRWORA) of 1996 and US federal tax incentives.

However, these assumptions on the detrimental effects of "non-traditional" family structures have repeatedly been shown to be false, with the true issues lying within socio-economic realities. Longitudinal research has shown the robust, positive effects of higher incomes and higher education levels on child well-being and emotional development, which reflects on the family stability, and not family structure. Further, proponents of this hypothesis often cite family statistics for those who commit crimes, but leave out how these compare to other populations, including the general population. For example, a 2009 survey conducted by the Substance Abuse and Mental Health Services Administration (SAMHSA) revealed that substance abuse amongst children raised by single mothers was higher than children raised by their biological parents. However, the percentage of substance abuse amongst children raised by single-mothers was not only remarkably low (5.4%), but also only 1.2% higher than children raised by both their parents. Those rates reveal to be even smaller when compared to other demographics of the same time period. According surveys commissioned by to the National Institute on Drug Abuse between 20 and 30% of teenagers used/abused illicit substances, a much higher rate than single-mother households. Another example of poorly cited statistics to further this narrative can be found in children who have lost at least one parent. In the U.S., the rate of parental death before age 16 is 8%. The rate of parental death is disproportionately high for prisoners (30–50%), however, it is also disproportionately high for high-performing scientists (26%) and US presidents (34%). Harvard's Baker Foundation Professor, Emerita, Dr. Teresa M. Amabile states, "Those kinds of events can crush a child, they can lead to a lot of problems; they can lead to substance abuse, they can lead to various forms of emotional illness. They can also lead to incredible resilience and almost superhuman behaviors, seemingly, if people can come through those experiences intact. I don’t know if we—we being the field in general—have discovered what the keys are, what makes the difference for kids." Understanding that socio-economic factors have greater effects on child development and emotional stability have led many to argue that single-parent and other non-traditional households should be afforded equivalent incentives by the state, as are afforded married households, and that focussing on family structure rather than family stability derails efforts to understand the realities of mass-shooters.

Parental supervision
“Studies have found that within offenders’ families, there is frequently a lack of supervision, low emotional closeness, and intimacy”. In a 2018 publication, Dr. George S. Everly, Jr, of The Johns Hopkins School of Medicine and The Johns Hopkins Bloomberg School of Public Health outlined an accumulation of seven, recurring themes that warrant consideration regarding school shooters. One factor is that school shooters tended to isolate themselves, and "exhibited an obsessive quality that often led to detailed planning, but ironically they seemed to lack an understanding of the consequences of their behavior and thus may have a history of adverse encounters with law enforcement." A criticism in the media of past shooters was questioning how so much planning could commence without alerting the parents or guardians to their efforts. However, this has proven to be as difficult of a question to answer as anticipating any of the past school shootings.

Data from the National Center for the Analysis of Violent Crime and Centers for Disease Control and Prevention, covering decades of US school shootings, reveals that 68% of shooters obtained weapons from their home or the home of a relative. Since 1999, out of 145 US school shootings committed by children/adolescents, 80% of the guns used were taken from their homes or relative's home. The availability of firearms has direct effect on the probability of initiating a school shooting. This has led many to question whether parents should be held criminally negligent for their children's gun-related crimes. By 2018, a total of four parents were convicted of failing to lock up the guns that were used to shoot up US schools by their children. Such incidents may also lead to nationwide discussion on gun laws.

The FBI offer a guide for helping to identify potential school shooters, The School Shooter: A Threat Assessment Perspective.

"Student 'Rules the Roost'"
"The parents set few or no limits on the child's conduct, and regularly give in to his demands. The student insists on an inordinate degree of privacy, and parents have little information about his activities, school life, friends, or other relationships. The parents seem intimidated by their child. They may fear he will attack them physically if they confront or frustrate him, or they may be unwilling to face an emotional outburst, or they may be afraid that upsetting the child will spark an emotional crisis. Traditional family roles are reversed: for example, the child acts as if he were the authority figure, while parents act as if they were the children."

"No Limits or Monitoring of TV and Internet"
"Parents do not supervise, limit or monitor the student's television watching or his use of the Internet. The student may have a TV in his own room or is otherwise free without any limits to spend as much time as he likes watching violent or otherwise inappropriate shows. The student spends a great deal of time watching television rather than in activities with family or friends. Similarly, parents do not monitor computer use or Internet access. The student may know much more about computers than the parents do, and the computer may be considered off limits to the parents while the student is secretive about his computer use, which may involve violent games or Internet research on violence, weapons, or other disturbing subjects."

This last passage includes the archaic notion that violent video games leads to school shootings. The FBI offer three cautions with their guide, 1) No trait or characteristic should be considered in isolation or given more weight than the others, 2) One bad day may not reflect a student's real personality or usual behavior, and 3) Many of these traits and behaviors are seen in adolescents with other, non-violent, issues.

Daniel Schechter, Clinical Psychiatrist, wrote that for a baby to develop into a troubled adolescent who then turns lethally violent, a convergence of multiple interacting factors must occur, that is "every bit as complicated...as it is for a tornado to form on a beautiful spring day in Kansas". Thus, reinforcing the issue that school shooters do not necessarily come from "bad" parents. No more than they could come from attentive, educated, negligent, single, married, abusive, or loving parents.

School bullying
Dorothy Espelage of the University of Florida observed that 8% of bullying victims become "angry, and aggressively so." She added, "They become very angry, they may act out aggressively online. They may not hit back, but they definitely ruminate."

"Bullying is common in schools and seemed to play a role in the lives of many of the school shooters". A typical bullying interaction consists of three parts, the offender/bully, a victim, and one or more bystanders. This formula of three enables the bully to easily create public humiliation for their victim. Students who are bullied tend to develop behavioral problems, depression, less self-control and poorer social skills, and to do worse in school. Once humiliated, victims never want to be a victim again and try to regain their image by joining groups. Often, they are rejected by their peers and follow through by restoring justice in what they see as an unjust situation. Their plan for restoration many times results in violence as shown by the school shooters. 75% of school shooters had been bullied or left behind evidence of having been victims of bullying .

The Uvalde shooter who killed 21 people was frequently bullied in 4th grade at Robb Elementary school.

Mental illness
The degree to which mental illness contributes to school shootings has been debated.

Although the vast majority of mentally ill individuals are non-violent, some evidence has suggested that mental illness or mental health symptoms are nearly universal among school shooters. A 2002 report by the US Secret Service and US Department of Education found evidence that a majority of school shooters displayed evidence of mental health symptoms, often undiagnosed or untreated. Criminologists Fox and DeLateur note that mental illness is only part of the issue, however, and mass shooters tend to externalize their problems, blaming others and are unlikely to seek psychiatric help, even if available. According to an article written on gun violence and mental illness, the existence of violence as an outlet for the mentally ill is quite prominent in some instances (Swanson et al., 2015). The article lists from a study that 12% of people with serious mental illness had committed minor or serious violence within the last year, compared to 2% of people without illness committing those same acts. Other scholars have concluded that mass murderers display a common constellation of chronic mental health symptoms, chronic anger or antisocial traits, and a tendency to blame others for problems. However, they note that attempting to "profile" school shooters with such a constellation of traits will likely result in many false positives as many individuals with such a profile do not engage in violent behaviors.

McGinty and colleagues conducted a study to find out if people tended to associate the violence of school shootings with mental illness, at the expense of other factors such as the availability of high-capacity magazines. Nearly 2,000 participants read a news piece on a shooting in which the shooter is diagnosed as having a mental illness and who used high capacity magazines. One group read an article that presented only the facts of the case. A different group read an article about the same shooting, but in it the author advocated for gun restrictions for people with mental illness. Another group read about the shooting in an article that suggested the proposal to ban large-capacity magazines, which acted to advocate that shootings could stem from a societal problem rather than an individual problem. The control group did not read anything. Participants were then all asked to fill in a questionnaire asking about their views on gun control and whether they thought there should be restrictions on high-capacity magazines. 71% of the control group thought that gun restrictions should be applied to people with mental illness, and nearly 80% of participants who read the articles agreed. Despite the fact that the article exposed the readers to both the mental illness of the shooter, and the fact that the shooter used high-capacity magazines, participants advocated more for gun restrictions on people with mental illness rather than bans on high-capacity magazines. This suggests that people believe mental illness is the culprit for school shootings in lieu of the accessibility of guns or other environmental factors. The authors expressed concern that proposals to target gun control laws at people with mental illness do not take into account the complex nature of the relationship between serious mental illness and violence, much of which is due to additional factors such as substance abuse. However, the link is unclear since research has shown that violence in mentally ill people occurs more in interpersonal environments.

It is also mentionable that school size can play a role on the presence of shooter mental health concerns. In a presented study from researchers Baird, Roellke & Zeifman from the Social Science Journal, it is presented that school size and level of attention given to students can precede violent actions, as students who commit mass shootings in larger schools are likely to have transitioned from smaller schools. This adds important nuance to the idea that larger schools are more prone to mass violence by showing that the stress associated with losing the personal support given in a smaller community is a weight on students.

A 2016 opinion piece published by U.S. News & World Report concluded that 22% of mass murders are committed by people who suffer from a serious mental illness, and 78% do not. This study also concluded that many people with mental illnesses do not engage in violence against others and that most violent behavior is due to factors other than mental illness.

Injustice collectors 
In a 2015 New Republic essay, Columbine author Dave Cullen describes a subset of school shooters (and other mass murderers) known as "injustice collectors", or people who "never forget, never forgive, [and] never let go" before they strike out. The essay describes and expands on the work of retired FBI profiler Mary Ellen O'Toole, who has published a peer-reviewed journal article on the subject. It also quotes Gary Noesner, who helped create and lead the FBI's hostage negotiation unit, and served as Chief Negotiator for ten years.

Violent media theory 
It has long been debated whether there exists a correlation between school shooting perpetrators and the type of media they consume. A popular profile for school shooters is someone who has been exposed to or enjoys playing violent video games. However, this profile is considered by many researchers to be misguided or erroneous. Ferguson (2009) has argued that a third variable of gender explains the illusory correlation between video game use and the type of people who conduct school shootings. Ferguson explains that the majority of school shooters are young males, who are considerably more aggressive than the rest of the population. A majority of gamers are also young males. Thus, it appears likely that the view that school shooters are often people who play violent video games is more simply explained by the third variable of gender. 

The idea of profiling school shooters by the video games they play comes from the belief that playing violent video games increases a person's aggression level, which in turn, can cause people to perpetrate extreme acts of violence, such as a school shooting. There is little to no data supporting this hypothesis (Ferguson, 2009)  but it has become a vivid profile used by the media since the Columbine Massacre in 1999.

A summation of past research on video game violence finds that video games have little to no effect on aggression. (Anderson, 2004; Ferguson, 2007 & Spencer, 2009) Again, this supports the idea that although it is a popular opinion to link school shooters to being violent video gamers; this misconception is often attributable to third variables and has not been supported by research on the connection between aggression and gaming.

Notoriety
Shooting massacres in English-speaking countries often occur close together in time. In the summer of 1966, two major stories broke: Richard Speck murdered eight women on a single night in Chicago, and Charles Whitman shot and killed 15 people from a clocktower at the University of Texas in Austin. Neither was seeking fame, but with the new television news climate, they received it anyway.  Seeing this, 18-year-old Robert Benjamin Smith bought a gun, and on November 12, 1966, he killed four women and a toddler inside the Rose-Mar College of Beauty in Mesa, Arizona. "I wanted to get known, just wanted to get myself a name," explained Smith. He had hoped to kill nearly ten times as many people, but had arrived at the beauty college campus too early. Upon his arrest, he was without remorse, saying simply, "I wanted people to know who I was." Towers, et al. (2015), found a small, but significant temporary increase in the probability of a second school shooting within 2 weeks after a known school shooting, which was only slightly smaller than the probability of repeats after mass killings involving firearms. 

However, much more work is needed with greater scope on investigations, to understand whether this is a real phenomenon or not. Some attribute this to copycat behavior, which can be correlated with the level of media exposure. In these copycat shootings, oftentimes the perpetrators see a past school shooter as an idol, so they want to carry out an even more destructive, murderous shooting in hopes of gaining recognition or respect. Some mass murderers study media reports of previous killers.

Recent premeditative writings were presented according to court documents and showed Joshua O'Connor wrote that he wanted the "death count to be as high as possible so that the shooting would be infamous". O'Connor was arrested before he was able to carry out his plan. Infamy and notoriety, "a desire to be remembered" has been reported as the leading reason for planned shootings by most perpetrators who were taken alive either pre or post shooting.

Taking influences from literature 
One of the infamous books, the 1977 novel Rage by Stephen King (written under the pseudonym Richard Bachman), was linked to five school shootings and hostage situations that took place between 1988 and 1997; the most recent of these, Heath High School shooting in 1997, was ultimately influential in King's decision to pull the book out of print for good.

Frequency trends
School shootings are a "modern phenomenon". There were scattered instances of gunmen or bombers attacking schools in the years before the Frontier Middle School shooting in Moses Lake, Washington in 1996, "but they were lower profile", according to journalist Malcolm Gladwell in 2015. In the United States specifically, the most recent trend has been downward following the spikes of the 1990s, yet at the same time they are trending towards a higher likelihood of being premeditated and executed with a strict plan in mind.

A study by Northeastern University found that "four times the number of children were killed in schools in the early 1990s than today".

On August 27, 2018, NPR reported that a U.S. Education Department report, released earlier in the year, for the 2015–2016 school year said "nearly 240 schools ... reported at least 1 incident involving a school-related shooting". However, when NPR researched this 'claim', it could confirm only 11 actual incidents.

By region

Africa
The following is a list of incidents of shootings that occurred in schools in Africa.

Asia
The following is a list of incidents of shootings that occurred in schools in Asia.

Canada
This article is listed in chronological order and provides additional details of incidents in which a firearm was discharged at a school in Canada, including incidents of shootings on a school bus. Mass killings in Canada are covered by a List of massacres in Canada.

Europe

The following is a list of incidents of shootings that occurred at schools in Europe.

Mexico
The following is a list of incidents of shootings that occurred at schools in Mexico.

Oceania
The following is a list of incidents of shootings that occurred in Oceania.

South America
The following is a list of incidents of shootings that occurred in South American schools.

United States

 
School shootings are a "uniquely American crisis", according to The Washington Post in 2018. School shootings are considered an "overwhelmingly American" phenomenon due to the availability of firearms in the United States. Kids at U.S. schools have active shooter drills. According to USA Today, in 2019 "about 95% of public schools now have students and teachers practice huddling in silence, hiding from an imaginary gunman."

Between the 1999 Columbine High School massacre in Colorado and the 2012 Sandy Hook Elementary School shooting in Connecticut, there were 31 school shootings in the United States and 14 in the rest of the world combined. Between 2000 and 2010, counting incidents from 37 countries in which someone was injured or killed on school grounds, with two or more victims, and not counting "single homicides, off-campus homicides, killings caused by government actions, militaries, terrorists or militants", the number of such incidents in the United States was one less than in the other 36 countries combined; in the vast majority of the United States incidents, perpetrators used guns.

The United States Federal government tracks school shootings, and as noted above, a U.S. Education Department report, released earlier in the year, for the 2015–2016 school year said "nearly 240 schools ... reported at least 1 incident involving a school-related shooting". NPR independently evaluated this claim and only confirmed 11 of the 240 cited incidents. Addressing school shootings in the United States was made more difficult by the passage by United States Congress of the Dickey Amendment in 1996, which mandated that no Centers for Disease Control and Prevention funds "may be used to advocate or promote gun control", although this does not mean the CDC has stopped researching gun violence. Instead, Congress relies on independent research done by non-partisan organizations for getting data on gun violence in the United States.

Between the Columbine massacre and the 2018 Santa Fe High School shooting in Texas, more than 214,000 students experienced gun violence at 216 schools, and at least 141 children, educators and other people were killed and another 284 were injured. 38% of the students who experienced school shootings were African American although African American students were 16.6% of the school population. Schools in at least 36 states and the District of Columbia have experienced a shooting.

Many school shootings in the United States result in one non-fatal injury. The type of firearm most commonly used in school shootings in the United States is the handgun. Three school shootings (the Columbine massacre, the Sandy Hook massacre, and the 2018 Stoneman Douglas High School shooting in Florida), accounted for 43% of the fatalities; the type of firearm used in the most lethal school shootings was the rifle. High-capacity magazines, which allow the perpetrator to fire dozens of rounds without having to reload, were used in the Columbine and Sandy Hook shootings.

70% of the perpetrators of school shootings were under the age of 18, with the median age of 16. More than 85% of the perpetrators of school shootings obtained their firearms from their own homes or from friends or relatives. Targeted school shootings, those occurring for example in the context of a feud, were about three times as common as those that appeared indiscriminate. Most perpetrators of school shootings exhibited no signs of debilitating mental disorder, such as psychosis or schizophrenia, although most mass killers typically have or exhibit signs of depression. On the other hand, Eric Harris was almost certainly a psychopath as noted by the FBI. Between the Columbine massacre and 2015, "more than 40 people" were "charged with Columbine-style plots;" almost all were white male teenagers and almost all had studied the Columbine attack or cited the Columbine perpetrators Eric Harris and Dylan Klebold as inspiration.

At least 68 schools that experienced a school shooting employed a police officer or security guard; in all but a few, the shooting ended before any intercession. Security guards or resource officers were present during four of the five school shooting incidents with the highest number of dead or injured: Columbine, the 2001 Santana High School shooting in California, the 2018 Marshall County High School shooting in Kentucky, and Stoneman Douglas.

There were 11 firearm-related events that occurred at a school or campus in the first 23 days of 2018. As of May 2018, more people, including students and teachers, were killed in 2018 in schools in the United States than were killed in military service for the United States, including both combat and non-combat military service, according to an analysis by The Washington Post. In terms of the year-to-date number of individual deadly school shootings incidents in the United States, early 2018 was much higher than 2017, with 16 in 2018 and four in 2017, through May; the year-to-day through May number of incidents was the highest since 1999. As of May 2018, thirteen school shootings took place on K–12 school property in 2018 that resulted in firearm-related injuries or deaths, including 32 killed and 65 injured, according to Education Week. 22 school shootings where someone was hurt or killed occurred in the United States in the first 20 weeks of 2018, according to CNN.

List of school shootings in the United States

As of 1 January 2023, the ten deadliest school shootings in the United States since the 1999 Columbine High School massacre in Colorado in which 13 were killed were the:

 2022 Robb Elementary School shooting in Uvalde, Texas (22 dead)
 2018 Stoneman Douglas High School shooting in Parkland, Florida (17 dead)
 2018 Santa Fe High School shooting in Texas (10 dead)
 2015 Umpqua Community College shooting near Roseburg, Oregon (10 dead)
 2012 Sandy Hook Elementary School shooting in Newtown, Connecticut (27 dead)
 2012 Oikos University shooting in Oakland, California (7 dead)
 2008 Northern Illinois University shooting (6 dead)
 2007 Virginia Tech shooting (33 dead)
 2006 West Nickel Mines School shooting in Bart Township, Lancaster County, Pennsylvania (6 dead)
 2005 Red Lake shootings in Minnesota (10 dead)

Other school shootings occurring in the United States include the 1966 University of Texas tower shooting in Austin in which 16 were killed; the 2001 Santana High School shooting in Santee, California, in which two were killed; the 2018 Marshall County High School shooting in Benton, Kentucky, in which two were killed; and the 2021 Oxford High School shooting in Oxford Township, Michigan, in which four were killed.

Studies of United States school shootings
During 1996, the CDC (Centers for Disease Control and Prevention) together with the US Department of Education and the United States Department of Justice, published a review of deaths related to schools occurring as a result of violence, including explicitly "unintentional firearm-related death", for the academic years 1992–1993 and 1993–1994. A second study (Anderson; Kaufman; Simon 2001), a continuation from the 1996 study, was published December 5, and covered the period 1994–1999.

A United States Secret Service study concluded that schools were placing false hope in physical security, when they should be paying more attention to the pre-attack behaviors of students. Zero-tolerance policies and metal detectors "are unlikely to be helpful," the Secret Service researchers found. The researchers focused on questions concerning the reliance on SWAT teams when most attacks are over before police arrive, profiling of students who show warning signs in the absence of a definitive profile, expulsion of students for minor infractions when expulsion is the spark that push some to return to school with a gun, buying software not based on school shooting studies to evaluate threats although killers rarely make direct threats, and reliance on metal detectors and police officers in schools when shooters often make no effort to conceal their weapons.

In May 2002, the Secret Service published a report that examined 37 U.S. school shootings. They had the following findings:
 Incidents of targeted violence at school were rarely sudden, impulsive acts.
 Prior to most incidents, other people knew about the attacker's idea or plan to attack.
 Most attackers did not threaten their targets directly prior to advancing the attack.
 There is no accurate or useful profile of students who engaged in targeted school violence.
 Most attackers engaged in some behavior prior to the incident that caused others concern or indicated a need for help.
 Most attackers had difficulty coping with significant losses or personal failures. Moreover, many had considered or attempted suicide.
 Many attackers felt bullied, persecuted, or injured by others prior to the attack.
 Most attackers had access to and had used weapons prior to the attack.
 In many cases, other students were involved in some capacity.
 Despite prompt law enforcement responses, most shooting incidents were stopped by means other than law enforcement intervention.

Cultural references

Film 
There have been many representations of American school shootings in films and TV shows produced by both United States and international production companies. While films Elephant, We Need to Talk about Kevin, Beautiful Boy, and Mass are solely focused on the either the act or the aftermath. Many of the shows such as Criminal Minds, Degrassi: the Next Generation, Law and Order, and One Tree Hill investigate the crime for an episode or use it as a plot point for about half a season.

Music 
Californian punk rock group The Offspring has created two songs about school shootings in the United States. In "Come Out and Play" (1994), the focus is on clashing school gangs, lamenting that "[kids] are getting weapons with the greatest of ease", "It goes down the same as a thousand before / No one's getting smarter / No one's learning the score / A never-ending spree of death and violence and hate". In the 2008 song "Hammerhead", a campus gunman thinks he is a soldier in a warzone.

One of the more provocative songs to come out of the Parkland, Florida high school shooting was "thoughts & prayers" from alternative artist/rapper grandson (born Jordan Benjamin). The song is a critique of politicians sending out their "thoughts and prayers" to the victims of the Stoneman Douglas High School shooting and other mass shootings, accompanied by what he perceives as a consistent resistance to gun control laws.

"I Don't Like Mondays" by Irish new wave band The Boomtown Rats was directly inspired by the 1979 Cleveland Elementary School shooting

The song "Pumped Up Kicks" by the band Foster the People, was inspired by the Columbine High School massacre.

Political impact
School shootings and other mass killings have had a major political impact. Governments have discussed gun-control laws, to increase time for background checks. Also, bulletproof school supplies have been created, including backpacks, desks, bullet-resistant door panels, and classroom whiteboards (or bulletin boards) which reinforce walls or slide across doors to deflect bullets. The National Rifle Association of America has proposed allowing teachers to carry weapons on school grounds as a means of protecting themselves and others as a possible solution. In 2018, 14 states had at least one school district in which teachers were armed, with another 16 states permitting districts to arm teachers subject to local policy. Most states also require the gun carriers to receive advance permission from the districts' superintendents or trustees. "In New York State, written permission from the school is required in order to carry a firearm on school grounds."

Due to the political impact, this has spurred some to press for more stringent gun control laws. In the United States, the National Rifle Association is opposed to such laws, and some groups have called for fewer gun control laws, citing cases of armed students ending shootings and halting further loss of life, and claiming that the prohibitions against carrying a gun in schools do not deter the gunmen. One such example is the Mercaz HaRav Massacre, where the attacker was stopped by a student, Yitzhak Dadon, who shot him with his personal firearm which he lawfully carried concealed. At a Virginia law school, there is a disputed claim that three students retrieved pistols from their cars and stopped the attacker without firing a shot. Also, at a Mississippi high school, the vice principal retrieved a firearm from his vehicle and then eventually stopped the attacker as he was driving away from the school. In other cases, such as shootings at Columbine and Red Lake High Schools, the presence of an armed police officer did little to nothing to prevent the killings.

The Gun-Free Schools Act was passed in 1994 in response to gun related violence in schools, so many school systems started adopting the Zero-Tolerance Law. The Gun-Free Schools Act required people to be expelled from the school for a year. By 1997, the Zero-Tolerance for any type of weapon was implemented by more than 90 percent of U.S. public schools.

Police response and countermeasures
Analysis of the Columbine school shooting and other incidents where first responders waited for backup has resulted in changed recommendations regarding what bystanders and first responders should do. An analysis of 84 mass shooting cases in the US from 2000 to 2010 found that the average response time by police was 3 minutes. In most instances that exceeds the time the shooter is engaged in killing. While immediate action may be extremely dangerous, it may save lives which would be lost if people involved in the situation remain passive, or a police response is delayed until overwhelming force can be deployed. It is recommended by the US Department of Homeland Security  that civilians involved in the incident take active steps to evacuate, hide, or counter the shooter and that individual law enforcement officers present or first arriving at the scene attempt immediately to engage the shooter. In many instances, immediate action by civilians or law enforcement has saved lives.

College and university response and countermeasures
The Massengill Report was an after-action report created in the wake of the Virginia Tech shooting, which brought national attention to the need for colleges and universities to take concerning behavior and threats seriously. It has led to the creation of hundreds of behavioral intervention teams which help access and co-ordinate institutional responses to behavioral concerns on college and university campuses.

School countermeasures

Armed classrooms 

There has been considerable policy discussion about how to help prevent school and other types of mass shootings. One suggestion that has come up is the idea to allow firearms in the classroom. "Since the issue of arming teachers is a relatively new topic, it has received little empirical study. Therefore, most of the literature does not come from peer-reviewed sources but rather published news reports. In addition, most of these reports are not objective and clearly appear to support a specific side of the debate." So far, data has been inconclusive as to whether or not arming teachers would have any sort of benefit for schools. For years, some areas in the US have allowed "armed classrooms" to deter (or truncate) future attacks by changing helpless victims into armed defenders. Advocates of arming teachers claim that it will reduce fatalities in school shootings, but many others disagree.

Many teachers have had their concerns with the idea of armed classrooms. "One teacher stated that although she is pro-gun, she does not feel as though she could maintain gun safety on school grounds (Reuters, 2012). Teachers expressed the fear that bigger students could overpower them, take the weapon, and then use it against the teacher or other students." Some members of the armed forces have also had concerns with armed classrooms. Police forces in Texas brought up the potential for teachers to leave a gun where a student could retrieve and use it. "They are further concerned that if every teacher had a gun, there would be an unnecessarily large number of guns in schools (even including elementary schools). This large number of guns could lead to accidental shootings, especially those involving younger children who do not understand what guns do."

To diminish school shootings there are many preventive measures that can be taken such as:
 Installing wireless panic alarms to alert law enforcement.
 Limiting points of entry with security guarding them.
 Strategically placing telephones for emergencies so police are always reachable at any point in the campus.
 Employing school psychologists to monitor and provide mental health services for those that need help.
 Coordinating a response plan between local police and schools in the event of a threat.

In a 2013 research report published by the Center for Homicide Research, they find that many also reject the idea of having armed classrooms due to what is termed the "weapons effect", which is the phenomenon in which simply being in the presence of a weapon can increase feelings of aggression. "In Berkowitz & LaPage's (1967) examination of this effect, students who were in the presence of a gun reported higher levels of aggressive feelings towards other students and gave more violent evaluations of other students' performance on a simple task in the form of electric shocks. This finding points to possible negative outcomes for students exposed to guns in the classroom (Simons & Turner, 1974; Turner & Simons, 1976)."

In 2008, Harrold Independent School District in Texas became the first public school district in the U.S. to allow teachers with state-issued firearm-carry permits to carry their arms in the classroom; special additional training and ricochet-resistant ammunition were required for participating teachers. Students at the University of Utah have been allowed to carry concealed pistols (so long as they possess the appropriate state license) since a State Supreme Court decision in 2006. In addition to Utah, Wisconsin and Mississippi each have legislation that allow students, faculty and employees with the proper permit, to carry concealed weapons on their public university's campuses. Colorado and Oregon state courts have ruled in favor of Campus Carry laws by denying their universities' proposals to ban guns on campus, ruling that the UC Board of Regents and the Oregon University System did not have the authority to ban weapons on campus. A selective ban was then re-instated, wherein Oregon state universities enacted a ban on guns in school building and sporting events or by anyone contracted with the university in question.
A commentary in the conservative National Review Online argues that the armed school approach for preventing school attacks, while new in the US, has been used successfully for many years in Israel and Thailand. Teachers and school officials in Israel are allowed and encouraged to carry firearms if they have former military experience in the IDF, which almost all do. Statistics on what percentage of teachers are actually armed are unavailable and in Israel, for example, the intent is to counter politically motivated terrorist attacks on high value, soft targets, not personal defense against, or protection from, unbalanced individual students.

The National Rifle Association has explicitly called for placing armed guards in all American schools. However, Steven Strauss, a faculty member at the Harvard Kennedy School of Government, offered a preliminary calculation that placing armed guards in every American school might cost as much as $15 billion/year, and perhaps only save 10 lives per year (at a cost of $1.5 billion/life saved).

Preventive measures 
Because of the increase in guns in the United States, many schools and local communities are taking it into their own hands by providing young students with early gun safety courses to make them aware of the dangers these objects actually are, also to prevent school shootings. According to Katherine A. Fowler, PhD, at the Centers for Disease Control and Prevention. An average 1,297 children die (two children per 100,000) and 5,790 are treated for injuries caused by guns each year, the study reported. Six percent of these deaths were accidental, 38% were suicides, 53% were homicides and the remaining 3% were from legal intervention or undetermined reasons. Guns injured children at a rate of 8 per 100,000 children, but this rate is likely considerably higher because of unreported injuries.

A preventive measure proposed for stopping school shooting has been focused on securing firearms in the home. A shooting in Sparks, Nevada on October 21, 2013, left a teacher and the shooter, a twelve-year-old student, dead with two seriously injured. The handgun used in the shooting had been taken from the shooter's home. Sandy Hook Elementary School in Newtown, Red Lake High School in Red Lake, Minnesota in 2005, and Heath High School in West Paducah, Kentucky in 1997 also involved legal guns taken from the home.

A 2000 study of firearm storage in the United States found that "from the homes with children and firearms, 55% reported to have one or more firearms in an unlocked place". 43% reported keeping guns without a trigger lock in an unlocked place. In 2005 a study was done on adult firearm storage practices in the United States found that over 1.69 million youth under age 18 are living in homes with loaded and unlocked firearms. Also, 73% of children under age 10 living in homes with guns reported knowing the location of their parents' firearms.

Most states have Child Access Prevention Laws—laws designed to prevent children from accessing firearms. Each state varies in the degree of the severity of these laws. The toughest laws enforce criminal liability when a minor achieves access to a carelessly stored firearm. The weakest forbid people from directly providing a firearm to a minor. There is also a wide range of laws that fall in between the two extremes. One example is a law that enforces criminal liability for carelessly stored firearms, but only where the minor uses the firearm and causes death or serious injury. An example of a weaker law is a law that enforces liability only in the event of reckless, knowing or deliberate behavior by the adult.

In 2019, the United States Secret Service released an analysis of targeted school violence, concluding the best practice for prevention was forming a "multidisciplinary threat assessment team, in conjunction with the appropriate policies, tools, and training". An earlier report published in 2018 concluded there was no single profile of a student attacker, and emphasized the importance of the threat assessment process instead. The threat assessment process described includes gathering information about student behaviors, negative or stressful events, and what resources are available for the student to overcome those challenges.

Countermeasures 
In 2015 Southwestern High School in Shelbyville, Indiana, was portrayed as possibly the "safest school in America". The school has been used as a "Safe School Flagship" of possible countermeasures to an active shooter.
 All teachers have lanyards with a panic button that alerts police.
 Classrooms have automatically locking "hardened doors", and windows have "hardened exterior glass" to deflect bullets and physical attack.
 Cameras, described as "military-grade", that feed video directly to Shelby County Sheriff's Office are mounted throughout the school.
 Smoke canisters mounted in the roof of corridors can be remotely discharged to slow a shooter's movement.

Other countermeasures include tools like doorjambs, rapidly-deployable tourniquets, and ballistic protection systems like the CoverMe-Seat.

In 2019, Fruitport High School in Michigan became the first school in the U.S. to be rebuilt with concrete barriers in hallways for students to hide from bullets. The BBC also reports the “hallways are curved to prevent a shooter from having a clear line of sight during any potential attack.” Classrooms have been redesigned so students can hide more easily. Costing $48 million to rebuild, Bob Szymoniak, Fruitport High School's superintendent, believes these alterations will become part of the structure of all U.S. schools. "These are design elements that are naturally part of buildings going into the future."

The STOP School Violence Act is pending legislation to provide funding grants to schools to be used for implementing security measures.

Aftereffects
After experiencing the threat of a school shooting, as well as the changes in the school via countermeasures, students continue to experience the trauma.  In several peer‐reviewed articles on mental health consequences of school shootings by Lowe & Galea, it is shown that mass shootings can bring on the onset of PTSD and continued depression. In the cities that are home to these kind of events, the town can experience continued paranoia and an exaggerated sense of fear. Lowe & Galea continue to say that continued research is necessary to pinpoint the exact mental symptoms that occur in the victims of school shootings.

See also

 List of school massacres by death toll
 List of school-related attacks
 List of unsuccessful attacks related to schools
 Threat assessment
 Bureau of Alcohol, Tobacco, Firearms and Explosives
 Campus carry in the United States
 Counter-terrorism
 Federal Bureau of Investigation
 Gun culture
 Gun politics in the United States
 Incendiary device
 Mass murder
 Mass shooting
 School bullying
 School violence
 Shoot (Hellblazer)
 Social rejection
 Soft target
 Suicide attack
 Suicide bombing
 Suicide by cop
 SWAT
 Terrorism

References

Sources
 
 Muschert, Glen – Sumiala, Johanna (eds.): School Shootings: Mediatized Violence in a Global Age. Studies in Media and Communications, 7. Bingley: Emerald, 2012.

External links

 BBC timeline of US school shootings
 Student Threat Assessment and Management System Guide
 Horrific School Shootings – slideshow by Life magazine
 School Shooters.info – database of information and documents relating to school shooters

Crimes against children
 
Terrorism by method
Education issues